Anna Christmann (born 24 September 1983) is a German politician of Alliance 90/The Greens who has been a member of the Bundestag, the German parliament, since the 2017 German federal election.

In addition to her parliamentary work, Christmann has been serving as Coordinator for Aerospace Policy at the Federal Ministry for Economic Affairs and Climate Action in the government of Chancellor Olaf Scholz since 2022.

Education and early career
Christmann studied political science at the University of Heidelberg and received a PhD from the University of Bern in 2011. During that time, she Christmann lived in Zurich and spent a semester at the University of California, Irvine.

Christman subsequently worked at the University of Zurich. From 2013 until 2017, she served in various positions at the State Ministry of Science, Research, and Arts of Baden-Württemberg, including as chief of staff to minister Theresia Bauer.

Political career
Christmann has been a member of the German Bundestag since the 2017 elections, representing the Stuttgart II district. In parliament, she has since been serving on the Committee on Education, Research and Technology Assessment and the Committee on the Digital Agenda. She is also her parliamentary group's spokesperson on technology and innovation policy.

In addition to her committee assignments, Christmann has been a member of the German delegation to the Franco-German Parliamentary Assembly since 2019. She also serves as deputy chairwoman of the German-Swiss Parliamentary Friendship Group.

Other activities

Corporate boards
 KfW Capital, Member of the Advisory Board (since 2022)

Non-profit organizations
 Leibniz Association, Member of the Senate (since 2022)
 Max Planck Institute for Intelligent Systems, Member of the Board of Trustees

References

External links

Personal homepage

Living people
1983 births
Members of the Bundestag for Baden-Württemberg
University of Bern alumni
Female members of the Bundestag
Members of the Bundestag 2021–2025
Members of the Bundestag 2017–2021
Members of the Bundestag for Alliance 90/The Greens
21st-century German women politicians